Vicki Leekx is a mixtape by British recording artist M.I.A. which was released on 31 December 2010. Following the release of her album Maya earlier in 2010, the artist announced via Twitter that she would be releasing a mixtape on the last day of the year, and subsequently made it available free to download. It incorporates reworked versions of tracks from Maya and new material and was reported as having been inspired by the 2010 WikiLeaks controversy, although much of its content is not politically inspired.

Background

M.I.A. released her third album Maya in July 2010 to mixed reviews. In early December, she announced on Twitter that she would be following it up with a mixtape to be released on 31 December, stating "vicky leekx  mixtape coming new years eve! layin bad minds to rest 2010!" The mixtape was uploaded online from Bangkok, Thailand after she sent it via YouSendIt to a friend, stating "VICKILEEKX up/loaded in BANGKOK! thank u, for being a dope ass people/city. cant seem to leave please kick me out! or i wont go!" Exclaim! writer Josiah Hughes contended that the latter portion of the message referred to events which had occurred during the year including the album's mixed reviews and her clashes with journalists and former collaborator Diplo.

Shortly before Christmas, the website vickileekx.com began displaying a countdown to the mixtape's release in the form of animated water rising up a dateline, and on 30 December M.I.A. uploaded a TwitPic showing the track listing and credits. Zach Baron, writing for The Village Voice, contended that the singer deliberately chose to release the mixtape at the point in the year when internet traffic is traditionally at its lowest, so as "not to feed the online content machines that chewed her up this year".

Music and lyrics
The material included reworked tracks and out-takes from Maya, with previously unreleased material. Some of the tracks, including "Let Me Hump You" and "Gen-N-E-Y", had been made available by M.I.A. earlier in the year at a series of bespoke website addresses. The tracks "Meds and Feds" and "Steppin' Up" from Maya appear in radically altered forms, including the removal of the heavy guitar played by Derek E. Miller of the group Sleigh Bells on the original version of the former.

A number of reviewers made a connection between the mixtape's title and the 2010 WikiLeaks controversy. Although the mix opens with a quote about the leaking of information and subsequent legal and political attacks from Julian Assange, founder of Wikileaks, delivered by a female voice, much of the content is not related to the controversy or politically themed. Musically, the mixtape is less abrasive in style than the industrial-influenced Maya, but the lyrics contain a number of attacks on "imitators, haters, and [...] psychos" and "bitches who are fame hoes". The female voice heard at the start, identified by reviewers as the "title character", returns sporadically during the mix speaking internet slogans. At different points the music incorporates heavy percussion, Auto-Tuned vocals, and "bhangra-style" sounds similar to those heard on her second studio album Kala. Most of the mix is at a high tempo, although it slows towards the end, where the longest sections are found.

Release and reception

Vicki Leekx has been downloadable for free since 31 December 2010 from a bespoke website. In its review of the mixtape, Sputnikmusic commented that "Maya Arulpragasam might have had a rough year, but with Vicki Leekx, she's ended it with a bang". Tom Breihan, a writer from Pitchfork, commented that in "its brief onslaught of sneery fun, Vicki Leekx only occasionally reaches the dizzy pop heights of Arular and Kala. But it does give us an M.I.A. who, once again, seems to be having a blast doing what she's doing. And it's great to learn this M.I.A. still exists". As of 6 January 2011, the track "Bad Girls" has been listed as "Best New Music" by the same website.

Matthew Cole, reviewing the mixtape in Slant Magazine, described Maya as "an act of musical self-immolation from a self-styled outsider uncomfortable with her own marketability" but that Vicki Leekx was an "ensuing ground-zero dance party" to follow up such a "levelling of her image". Mike Schiller, writing for webzine PopMatters, was positive in his review but stated that the mix sounded like "an artist throwing ideas at a wall and seeing what sticks". In consumer guide for MSN Music, critic Robert Christgau gave Vicki Leekx a B+ rating, indicating "remarkable one way or another, yet also flirts with the humdrum or the half-assed".

Track listing
Although the mixtape consists of a single 36-minute file, the artwork released to accompany it lists twenty "tracks".

Personnel
The artwork released to accompany the mixtape credits the producers, listed as M.I.A. herself, Danja, Munchi, Diplo, Blaqstarr, Switch, Rusko, VIIXIIV (a pseudonym for her brother Sugu Arulpragasam) and So Japan, and featured vocals by Rosaly Pfeffer, credited mononymously as Rosaly. The name of Nguzunguzu, a duo which includes Asma Maroof, M.I.A.'s tour DJ, is also prominently displayed, although it is unclear what involvement the duo had in the project.

References

Albums produced by M.I.A. (rapper)
Albums produced by Diplo
Albums produced by Danja (record producer)
M.I.A. (rapper) albums
2010 mixtape albums
Albums free for download by copyright owner